John Russel Roden (1918–????) was an American politician who was elected to the Los Angeles City Council in 1946 to succeed Meade McClanahan, who was recalled from office. Roden served until mid-1947 and was defeated for reelection.

Biography
Roden was a U.S. Army transport pilot during World  War II. He was married on September 18, 1946 to Nadine Romoli. They were divorced in January 1952. After his council service ended in 1947, he was a television manufacturing executive and an  encyclopedia salesman.

Elections

City Council

City Councilman Meade McClanahan faced a recall election on March 19, 1946, brought about by public dissatisfaction in Los Angeles City Council District 13 with his auditorium appearances with political leader Gerald L. K. Smith, the founder of the America First Party. Roden, 28,  was the candidate put forth by the forces proposing the recall, which was approved by a vote of 12,394 to 8,913. He won the accompanying election to fill the rest of McClanahan's term by 11,394 votes to 1,028 for Hubert Wallis and 929 for John P. McGinley. He took the oath of office on March 28, 1946.  In those days the district represented Silver Lake and an area west of downtown to Vermont Avenue and south to Valley Boulevard.

In the mid-1947 municipal elections, Roden faced State Assembly Member Ernest E. Debs, who finished first in the primaries but without a majority. In the final election, Debs was elected by a vote of 15,932 to 11,746 for Roden.

State Assembly
Late in 1947 Roden attempted to run for the California State Assembly but was ruled off the ballot by a judge because he had filed his affidavit of candidacy shortly before midnight on September 30 instead of observing a 5 p.m. deadline.

Positions
Incinerator, 1946. Roden drew the ire of "hundreds of angry citizens" who crowded the City Hall to protest the building of a city incinerator at Avenue 28 and Lacy Streets in Lincoln Heights. Roden had voted in favor of the incinerator just a few months earlier.

Film strike, 1946. Roden was the only council member opposing the offer of a reward of $1,000 in connection with November 1946 violence occurring during a strike of film technicians at Columbia Studios. Late in the year, as the strike lingered, a Roden resolution asking for arbitration drew the ire of Councilman Ed J. Davenport, who said:

Roden has shown his bias in this matter right along. He cast the one vote against this Council offering a reward for the detection of bomb throwers and he tried to get the Health Department to condemn the City Jail, so that arrested strike pickets would be released.

Communism, 1947. The feud continued the next year with Davenport submitting a resolution asking that the council be kept informed about "the progress of various bills before the Congressional Committee on Un-American Activities." Roden and Davenport traded "epithets" over the measure.

References
Access to the Los Angeles Times links may require the use of a library card.

Los Angeles City Council members
1910s births
Year of death missing